Joy-Lance Mickels (born 29 March 1994) is a German professional footballer who plays as a winger for Azerbaijani club Sabah.

Career
Mickels started playing football at VSF Amern at the age of four and was then a part of the Borussia Mönchengladbach youth academy for eight years from 2005. In the 2012–13 season for the Borussia Mönchengladbach U19 team, Mickels, who had his best season yet with 17 goals and three assists, reached the semi-finals of the DFB Junior Cup, where they were eliminated on penalties against 1. FC Kaiserslautern. During the season, he also made his first appearance for the reserve team, Borussia Mönchengladbach II, in the fourth-tier Regionalliga, where he began playing permanently from summer 2013.

A year later, Mickels moved to Schalke 04, where he played for the reserve team, Schalke 04 II. During his two seasons there, he scored nine goals and made three assists in 43 Regionalliga games. Mickels continued his career in the Regionalliga West for the 2016–17 season at Alemannia Aachen.

In the summer of 2017, Mickels moved to Regionalliga Nordost club Wacker Nordhausen. In his first season, he became a regular starter, and with six goals and twelve assists had a large share in the club finishing runners-up. The following season, Wacker finished in third place in the league table and won the Thuringian Cup. Mickels largely missed the first half of the 2019–20 season due to a knee injury and then made two appearances for the reserve side in the NOFV-Oberliga.

After Wacker Nordhausen filed for bankruptcy and many players left the club, Mickels moved to 3. Liga club FC Carl Zeiss Jena in late January 2020, with whom he received a contract valid until the end of the season. In pre-season, he had already successfully completed a trial practice session with 2. Bundesliga club Dynamo Dresden. In various offensive positions, Mickels remained goal-less and suffered relegation with Carl Zeiss Jena to the Regionalliga; bottom of the table.

After Mickels' contract was not renewed, he was signed by the Dutch second-tier Eerste Divisie club MVV Maastricht in late August 2020 and signed a one-year contract.

On 10 July 2022, Mickels signed a two-year contract with Azerbaijan Premier League club Sabah.

Personal life
Joy-Lance's twin brother Joy-Slayd is also a professional footballer, as is their younger brother Leroy-Jacques (b. 1995). The three brothers, whose parents come from the Congo, played together at under-19 level for Borussia Mönchengladbach.

Honours
Wacker Nordhausen
 Thuringian Cup: 2019

References

Living people
1994 births
Association football midfielders
German footballers
Borussia Mönchengladbach II players
FC Schalke 04 II players
Alemannia Aachen players
FSV Wacker 90 Nordhausen players
FC Carl Zeiss Jena players
MVV Maastricht players
Sabah FC (Azerbaijan) players
3. Liga players
Regionalliga players
Eerste Divisie players
Oberliga (football) players
German expatriate footballers
German expatriate sportspeople in the Netherlands
Expatriate footballers in the Netherlands
German expatriate sportspeople in Azerbaijan
Expatriate footballers in Azerbaijan
People from Siegburg
Sportspeople from Cologne (region)
Footballers from North Rhine-Westphalia